Eremias quadrifrons (commonly known as the Alachan racerunner) is a species of lizard endemic to China.

References

Eremias
Reptiles described in 1876
Taxa named by Alexander Strauch